Robert Marsh was Governor of the Bank of England from 1762 to 1764. He had been Deputy Governor from 1760 to 1762. He replaced Bartholomew Burton as Governor and was succeeded by John Weyland. Marsh's tenure as Governor occurred during the Bengal bubble (1757–1769).

See also
Chief Cashier of the Bank of England

References

External links

Governors of the Bank of England
Year of birth missing
Year of death missing
British bankers
Deputy Governors of the Bank of England